"Unbroken" is a song written by Annie Roboff and Holly Lamar and recorded by American country music artist Tim McGraw. It was released in May 2002 as the fourth and final single from McGraw's 2001 album Set This Circus Down. The song reached No. 1 on the US Billboard Hot Country Singles & Tracks (now Hot Country Songs) chart in September 2002.

Content
"Unbroken" is a moderate uptempo song set in the key of B major with a tempo of approximately 120 beats per minute.

Chart performance
"Unbroken" debuted at No. 60 on the U.S. Billboard Hot Country Singles & Tracks for the chart week of May 25, 2002 and peaked at No. 1 in September.

Year-end charts

References

2002 singles
2001 songs
Tim McGraw songs
Songs written by Holly Lamar
Song recordings produced by Byron Gallimore
Song recordings produced by Tim McGraw
Song recordings produced by James Stroud
Songs written by Annie Roboff
Curb Records singles